Markus Andersson (born 25 February 1968) is a Swedish artist and teacher of art
at Medborgarskolan and Folkuniversitetet in Uppsala.
 
Markus Andersson was educated at Konstskolan Idun Lovén, Heatherley School of Fine Art
and has studied under Odd Nerdrum. He runs his own art gallery named Galleri Sörängen, located 
outside Uppsala. Markus Andersson was awarded the Magnus Laurentius Medici award in the category 
painting at the Florence Biennale in 2003.
 
Markus Andersson works primarily in oil and watercolor. His pictures are characterized by Alex Brich
as traditional Nordic art with national romantic and political motives, in a naturalistic style
depicting animals, nature and people. During the bright time of the year Andersson is engaged
preferably to depict marine motifs in the open air, including on the Norwegian east coast and 
in Bohuslän. Paintings by Andersson have been exhibited at Moderna museet, Louvre, Bruno
Liljefors studio, Florence biennale, Kitsch biennale and several galleries and museums in Sweden, 
Norway and Estonia. His art is represented at Sweden's Embassy in Tallinn and Swedish 
St Michael's Church in Tallinn.

The 2006 Modern Exhibition 

The artist Dorinel Marc offered his place at Moderna museet's Modern exhibition 2006 to Andersson, 
who exhibited a number of oil paintings with natural motifs and contemporary images. 
Among other things, portraits of Christer Pettersson, Daniel Wretström, Pim Fortuyn, 
Theo van Gogh and Mijailo Mijailovic were shown.

Reactions 
The work that attracted the most attention among the media and the public in connection with 
the exhibition at Moderna museet 2006 was a painting depicting Christer Pettersson and a scapegoat,
titled Swedish scapegoats. The painting was an expression of the scapegoat and of William
Holman Hunt's painting "The Scapegoat". When Markus Andersson painted Swedish scapegoats he used a photograph as a model during the work on the part 
of the board that representsChrister Pettersson. The author of the photograph, the press photographer 
Jonas Lemberg, later took proceedings against Markus Andersson and claimed that he was guilty of copyright infringement. The dispute was settled to Markus Andersson's advantage in February 2017, when the Supreme Court 
ruled that Swedish scapegoats were a new and independent work that did not infringe upon copyright 
to the photo.

Gallery

References

External links

 Official website 

1968 births
21st-century Swedish painters
21st-century Swedish male artists
Swedish male painters
Living people
Swedish landscape painters
Swedish portrait painters
Swedish watercolourists
Students of Odd Nerdrum